Vanguard University of Southern California is a private Christian university in Costa Mesa, California. It was the first four-year college in Orange County. The university offers over 39 undergraduate degrees and emphases in 15 different departments. The university also offers adult-learning programs in its professional studies department and features six graduate degrees. It is accredited by the WASC Senior College and University Commission.

History
In summer 1920, Harold K. Needham, D. W. Kerr, and W. C. Pierce opened Southern California Bible School, an institution intended to prepare Christian workers for the various ministries of the church. The school moved from Los Angeles to Pasadena in 1927, and was chartered by the state of California in 1939 to grant degrees. Given this new distinction, the former Southern California Bible School became Southern California Bible College, the first four-year institution of the Assemblies of God. In 1943 the college received recognition by the government for the training of military chaplains. It moved to the present campus in 1950, becoming the first four-year college in Orange County. Its name was changed to Southern California College nine years later when majors in the liberal arts were added to the curriculum.

Regional accreditation and membership in the Western Association of Schools and Colleges were granted in 1964. In 1967 the college received recognition and approval of its teaching credential program from the California State Board of Education. In June 1983 the Graduate Studies Program received approval from the Western Association of Schools and Colleges. A Degree Completion Program was started in 1994 for adult learners. On July 1, 1999, university status was achieved when Southern California College registered with the Secretary of State's Office as Vanguard University of Southern California. The university comprises the Undergraduate College and the School for Graduate and Professional Studies.

Campus
Vanguard is in Costa Mesa, California, centrally located in Orange County and about halfway between Los Angeles and San Diego.  Two graduate programs (organizational psychology and clinical psychology) are housed nearby at a satellite campus in Santa Ana.

Organization and administration
In addition to its founding president, Harold K. Needham, Vanguard University of Southern California has had nine subsequent presidents: Daniel W. Kerr, Irvine J. Harrison, John B. Scott, O. Cope Budge, Emil A. Balliet, Wayne E. Kraiss, Murray W. Dempster,  Carol Taylor, and Dr. Michael J. Beals, who took office on February 7, 2014.

Rankings
In 2019, the school was ranked #43 in U.S. News & World Report' Western Regional Colleges ranking, and was named by The Princeton Review as one of its 124 “Best Western” Colleges. Vanguard was named in the 2012-13 list of Christian Colleges of Distinction and was 99th on the Forbes list of best universities in the West.

Athletics
The Vanguard athletic teams are called the Lions. The university is a member of the National Association of Intercollegiate Athletics (NAIA), primarily competing in the Golden State Athletic Conference (GSAC) for most of its sports since the 1986–87 academic year; while its men's & women's wrestling teams compete in the Cascade Collegiate Conference (CCC).

Vanguard competes in 20 intercollegiate varsity sports: Men's sports include baseball, basketball, cross country, golf, soccer, track & field, volleyball and wrestling; while women's sports include basketball, beach volleyball, cross country, dance, golf, soccer, sideline dance, softball, stunt, track & field, volleyball and wrestling.

Accomplishments
In 2014, Vanguard won the NAIA Division I men's basketball championship in Kansas City, Missouri. In 2008, the women's basketball team won the NAIA Division I National Championship in Jackson, Tennessee.

Facilities
 "The Pit" - men's and women's Basketball, Stunt, men's and women's Volleyball
 Dean Harvey Field - Baseball
 Soccer Complex - Soccer
 Softball Complex - Softball

Notable alumni and faculty 
 Daniel Amen, psychiatrist and author
 Heidi Baker, Christian missionary and author
 Ila Borders, professional female baseball player
 Stephanie Borowicz, Member of the Pennsylvania House of Representatives
 Ralph Carmichael, jazz and contemporary Christian musician and arranger
 Cubbie Fink, musician
 Jason Frenn, Missionary Evangelist, conference speaker, and author
 José Rojas, professional baseball player
 Julius Kim, President of The Gospel Coalition and former professor of Westminster Seminary California
 Brent Kutzle, musician
 Larry Mantle, radio show host
 Emily Rose, actress

References

External links
 
 Official athletics website

Buildings and structures in Costa Mesa, California
Council for Christian Colleges and Universities
Educational institutions established in 1920
Pentecostalism in California
Religion in Orange County, California
Schools accredited by the Western Association of Schools and Colleges
Universities and colleges in Orange County, California
Universities and colleges affiliated with the Assemblies of God
1920 establishments in California
Private universities and colleges in California